Sefa Yılmaz (born 14 February 1990) is a Turkish footballer who plays as a winger for TFF First League club Çaykur Rizespor.

International 
Sefa was eligible to play for the German Football Association, but switched permanently to the Turkey national football team.

Honours 
Sivasspor
 Turkish Cup: 2021–22

External links 
 
 Player profile at MSV Duisburg 
 Sefa Yılmaz at kicker.de 
 

1990 births
Footballers from Berlin
German people of Turkish descent
Living people
Turkish footballers
Turkey international footballers
Turkey B international footballers
Turkey under-21 international footballers
Turkey youth international footballers
German footballers
Association football midfielders
VfL Wolfsburg II players
MSV Duisburg players
Kayserispor footballers
Trabzonspor footballers
Alanyaspor footballers
Gaziantepspor footballers
Boluspor footballers
Altınordu F.K. players
Gençlerbirliği S.K. footballers
Sivasspor footballers
Çaykur Rizespor footballers
Regionalliga players
2. Bundesliga players
Süper Lig players
TFF First League players